The Dusse-Alin is a mountain range in Khabarovsk Krai, Russian Far East.

History
The range was first roughly mapped by Russian explorer Alexander von Middendorf in 1844. In the wake of his studies, a large Russian military expedition led by Nikolai Khristoforovich Akhte continued the exploration of the area between 1849 and 1853. The German surveyor of the Russian service Ludwig Schwarz took part in the expedition as an astronomer. Together with topographers Stepan Vasilievich Krutiv and Alexei Argunov, as well as geologist Nikolay Gavrilovich Meglitsky, the Dusse-Alin range area was studied and topographically surveyed in detail. Based on their measurements, the first accurate map of the Dusse-Alin was drawn. In 1861 German botanist and geologist of the Russian service Fyodor Schmidt carried out thorough physiographic and geological research in the area of the range.

In 1987 a  section of the central and southern part of the range was declared a protected area (zapovednik), the Bureya Nature Reserve.

Geography
The Dusse-Alin and the Yam-Alin to the north of it are northern prolongations of the Bureya Range. The highest point of the range is an unnamed peak with a height of  located roughly in the central part. 

To the northwest of the range the Ezop Range extends westwards. In the north it connects with the southern end of the Yam-Alin and the Bureya Range stretches roughly southwestwards at the southwestern end. To the east of the range flows the Amgun river.

Hydrography
The Dusse-Alin forms the watershed between the rivers of the Bureya and Selemdzha basins, and those of the Amgun basin. Among the rivers having their sources in the slopes of the range are the left and right Bureya, that give origin to the Bureya river, as well as the Nilan — a left tributary of the Amgun, and several right tributaries of the Kerby, also a left tributary of the Amgun.

Flora 

See also
List of mountains and hills of Russia
Tourism in Khabarovsk Krai

References

External links
Lake Medvezhye (Bear Lake), Dusse Alin mountain range (2325m), Khabarovsk region in the Far East of Russia. Picture by photographer Andrey Grachev, July 2021 

Mountain ranges of Khabarovsk Krai
ceb:Khrebet Dusse-Alin'
ru:Дуссе-Алинь